Oliver Stokes (born 29 May 1998) is an English actor. He is best known for playing the role of Michael Garvey in Benidorm, from 2007 to 2015.

Career
Stokes first came to prominence with his role as Michael Garvey in Derren Litten’s ITV comedy, Benidorm, a role he played from 2007 to 2015. Stokes played Don Weatherby's boy in Heartbeat (2008), Nigel Clough in The Damned United (2009) and played George Davies in a 2012 episode of BBC Doctors. Alongside his Benidorm cast-family, Stokes appeared in the 2011 Christmas special of All Star Family Fortunes.

In 2017, Stokes appeared in one episode of Casualty.

Personal life
Stokes has one child, a son called Archie.

Credits

External links

References 

English male film actors
English male television actors
English male child actors
Living people
1998 births